Organização Mineira de Transportes Aéreos – OMTA was a Brazilian airline founded in 1946. In 1950 it was sold to Transportes Aéreos Nacional, which eventually incorporated the airline in 1957.

History 
OMTA began its operations on January 28, 1946 as an air charter company, the first of its kind in Brazil. Later OMTA also operated some scheduled flights. On July 20, 1950 it was bought by Transportes Aéreos Nacional. OMTA operated as an autonomous unity for sometime but eventually in 1957 it was absorbed by Nacional.

Fleet

References 

Defunct airlines of Brazil
Airlines established in 1946
Airlines disestablished in 1957
1946 establishments in Brazil